KZMT (101.1 FM) is a radio station licensed to serve Helena, Montana. The station is owned by Kevin Terry and licensed to the Montana Radio Company, LLC. It airs a Classic rock music format.

The station was assigned the KZMT call letters by the Federal Communications Commission on October 8, 1984.

History
In August 2000, a deal was reached for KZMT to be acquired by Commonwealth Communications LLC from STARadio Corp. as part of a nine-station deal with a total reported sale price of $7.5 million.

In October 2003, a deal was reached for KZMT to be acquired by Cherry Creek Radio from Commonwealth Communications LLC as part of a 24-station deal with a total reported sale price of $41 million.

In 2014, KZMT dropped the Dial Global syndicated classic rock programming in favor of locally produced programming, with the only exception being the regional syndication of Classic rock sister (Z100 Missoula) morning show The Brian & Chris Show.

On April 5, 2017, Montana Radio Company announced it would acquire Cherry Creek Media's Helena stations. The purchase was consummated on July 28, 2017.

References

External links

ZMT
Lewis and Clark County, Montana
Classic rock radio stations in the United States
Radio stations established in 1975
1999 establishments in Montana